Al-Harrah may refer to:

Places
Harrah, Ras al-Khaimah
Al Harra', Makkah
Al Harrah, Yemen
Al Harrah, Saudi Arabia
Al-Harra, Syria

History
Battle of al-Harrah

ca:Harra